Yoo Hyeong-Jong (born December 6, 1985) is a South Korean football forward. He is currently a free agent.

Career
In 2007 Yoo Hyeong-Jong played for Yangju FC in the South Korean amateur K3 League. He spent the 2008 season in Sportakademklub of Russian First Division.

External links 
  Profile at stats.sportbox.ru

1985 births
Living people
Association football midfielders
South Korean footballers
South Korean expatriate footballers
Expatriate footballers in Russia
FC Sportakademklub Moscow players